Gennady Ivanovich Sklyar (May 17, 1952,  Termez, Surxondaryo Region) is a Russian political figure, deputy of the 8th State Duma. 

Until 1991, Sklyar was a member of the Communist Party of the Soviet Union. In October 1991, he became one of the initiators of the unification of the Russian left forces with a socialist orientation. In December 1992, in Moscow, at the founding congress of the Socialist Party of Workers (SPT), he was elected one of its co-chairs. In 1993, he became an expert and personal consultant to the first vice-chairman of the Supreme Soviet of Russia. From 1994 to 1996, he was an assistant to the deputy of Valery Sudarenkov. In 2016 and 2021, he was the deputy of the 7th and 8th State Dumas.

References

1952 births
Living people
United Russia politicians
21st-century Russian politicians
Eighth convocation members of the State Duma (Russian Federation)
Seventh convocation members of the State Duma (Russian Federation)